Averin (masculine) or Averina (feminine) is a Russian last name, a variant of Averkiyev. The following people share this last name:
Aleksandr Averin (disambiguation), several people
Andrey Averin, resident of Comedy Club, a Russian stand-up comedy TV show
Arina Averina and Dina Averina (both b. 1998), twin sisters, Russian rhythmic gymnasts
Egor Averin (Yegor Averin) (b. 1989), Russian ice hockey player
Joyce Helena Averina, 1987 British Empire Medal recipient
Konstantin Averin, Kazakhstani gymnast participating in the Men's Pair event at the 2010 Acrobatic Gymnastics World Championships
Maksym Averin, Ukrainian cyclist, member of the Azerbaijani Synergy Baku Cycling Project cycling team
Maxim Averin, actor playing Shidla in the 2006 Russian science fiction movie Asiris Nuna
Mikhail Averin, Soviet pilot claiming to be the assailant of George Andrew Davis Jr., US World War II flying ace
Natalya Averina, Miss World 2010 contestant representing Denmark
Oleksandr Averin, Ukrainian cross-country skiing trainer of the Turkish team at the 2006 Winter Olympics
Tatyana Averina (1950–2001), Soviet/Russian Olympic speed skater
Vasiliy Averin, head of the Yekaterinoslav Bolshevik Uprising in 1918 and of the Executive Committee of Volhynian Governorate in 1920
Viktor Averin, Russian criminal who, together with Sergey Mikhaylov, founded the Solntsevo criminal group
Yury Averin, actor who played Muller in the 1959 Soviet movie Destiny of a Man

References

Notes

Sources
Ю. А. Федосюк (Yu. A. Fedosyuk). "Русские фамилии: популярный этимологический словарь" (Russian Last Names: a Popular Etymological Dictionary). Москва, 2006. 



Russian-language surnames